James Francis Brennan (10 September 1884 – 6 September 1917) was an Irish professional football inside right who made one appearance in the Football League for Bury. He also played in the Southern League for Brighton & Hove Albion.

Personal life 
Brennan attended Prior Park College in Bath. He served in the King's Regiment (Liverpool) and the Lancashire Fusiliers during the First World War and was holding the rank of corporal when he was killed in action in West Flanders, Belgium on 6 September 1917. Brennan is commemorated on the Tyne Cot Memorial to the Missing.

Honours 
Africa Royal

 West Cheshire League: 1906–07
 Liverpool Shield: 1906–07

Notes

References

1884 births
Irish association footballers (before 1923)
Bury F.C. players
Brighton & Hove Albion F.C. players
Association football inside forwards
1917 deaths
Association footballers from County Tipperary
English Football League players
British Army personnel of World War I
King's Regiment (Liverpool) soldiers
Southern Football League players
Lancashire Fusiliers soldiers
British military personnel killed in World War I
People educated at Prior Park College
Irish casualties of World War I
West Cheshire Association Football League players